The following article presents a summary of the 2017 football (soccer) season in Brazil, which was the 116th season of competitive football in the country.

Campeonato Brasileiro Série A

The 2017 Campeonato Brasileiro Série A started on May 13, 2017, and concluded on December 3, 2017.

Atlético Goianiense
Atlético Mineiro
Atlético Paranaense
Avaí
Bahia
Botafogo
Chapecoense
Corinthians
Coritiba
Cruzeiro
Flamengo
Fluminense
Grêmio
Palmeiras
Ponte Preta
Santos
São Paulo
Sport
Vasco da Gama
Vitória

Corinthians won the Campeonato Brasileiro Série A.

Relegation
The four worst placed teams, which are Coritiba, Avaí, Ponte Preta and Atlético Goianiense, were relegated to the following year's second level.

Campeonato Brasileiro Série B

The 2017 Campeonato Brasileiro Série B started on May 12, 2017, and concluded on November 25, 2017.

ABC
América Mineiro
Boa Esporte
Brasil de Pelotas
Ceará
CRB
Criciúma
Figueirense
Goiás
Guarani
Internacional
Juventude
Londrina
Luverdense
Náutico
Oeste
Paraná
Paysandu
Santa Cruz
Vila Nova

América Mineiro won the Campeonato Brasileiro Série B.

Promotion
The four best placed teams, which are América Mineiro, Internacional, Ceará and Paraná, were promoted to the following year's first level.

Relegation
The four worst placed teams, which are Luverdense, Santa Cruz, ABC and Náutico, were relegated to the following year's third level.

Campeonato Brasileiro Série C

The 2017 Campeonato Brasileiro Série C started on May 14, 2017, and concluded on October 21, 2017.

ASA
Bragantino
Botafogo (PB)
Botafogo (SP)
Confiança
CSA
Cuiabá
Fortaleza
Joinville
Macaé
Moto Club
Mogi Mirim
Remo
Salgueiro
Sampaio Corrêa
São Bento
Tombense
Tupi
Volta Redonda
Ypiranga

The Campeonato Brasileiro Série C final was played between CSA and Fortaleza.

CSA won the league after beating Fortaleza

Promotion
The four best placed teams, CSA, Fortaleza, São Bento and Sampaio Corrêa, were promoted to the following year's second level.

Relegation
The four worst placed teams, Moto Club, Macaé, Mogi Mirim and ASA, were relegated to the following year's fourth level.

Campeonato Brasileiro Série D

The 2017 Campeonato Brasileiro Série D started on May 21, 2017, and concluded on September 10, 2017.

Altos
América de Natal
América (PE)
Anápolis
Aparecidense
Atlético Acreano

Audax
Bangu
Baré
Boavista
Brusque
Caldense
Campinense
Ceilândia
Central
Comercial (MS)
Cordino
Coruripe

Espírito Santo
Fast Clube
Fluminense de Feira
Foz do Iguaçu
Genus
Globo
Guarani de Juazeiro
Guarany de Sobral
Gurupi
Inter de Lages
Itabaiana
Ituano
Itumbiara
Jacobina
Juazeirense
Luziânia
Maranhão
Metropolitano
Murici
Novo Hamburgo
Operário Ferroviário
Parnahyba
Portuguesa (RJ)
Portuguesa (SP)
Potiguar

PSTC
Real Ariquemes
Red Bull Brasil
Rio Branco (AC)
River
Santos (AP)
São Bernardo
São Francisco
São José (RS)
São Paulo (RS)
São Raimundo (PA)
São Raimundo (RR)
Sergipe
Sete de Dourados
Sinop
Sousa
Tocantins de Miracema
Trem
União Rondonópolis
URT
Villa Nova
XV de Piracicaba

The Campeonato Brasileiro Série D final was played between Operário Ferroviário and Globo.

Operário Ferroviário won the league after beating Globo

Promotion
The four best placed teams, Operário Ferroviário, Globo, Atlético Acreano and Juazeirense, were promoted to the following year's third level.

Domestic cups

Copa do Brasil

The 2017 Copa do Brasil started on February 8, 2017, and concluded on September 27, 2017. The Copa do Brasil final was played between Flamengo and Cruzeiro.

Cruzeiro won the cup after defeating Flamengo.

Copa do Nordeste

The competition featured 20 clubs from the Northeastern region. It started on January 24, 2017 and concluded on May 24, 2017. The Copa do Nordeste final was played between Bahia and Sport.

Bahia won the cup after defeating Sport.

Copa Verde

The competition featured 18 clubs from the North and Central-West regions, including the Espírito Santo champions. It started on January 29, 2017 and concluded on May 16, 2017. The Copa Verde final was played between Luverdense and Paysandu.

Luverdense won the cup after defeating Paysandu.

Primeira Liga

The competition features 12 clubs from the South and Southeastern regions, including Minas Gerais and Rio de Janeiro State teams.  It started on January 24, 2017 and concluded on October 8, 2017.  The Primeira Liga final was played between Londrina and Atlético Mineiro.

Londrina won the cup after defeating Atlético Mineiro.

State championship champions

State cup competition champions

Youth competition champions

(1) The Copa Nacional do Espírito Santo Sub-17, between 2008 and 2012, was named Copa Brasil Sub-17. The similar named Copa do Brasil Sub-17 is organized by the Brazilian Football Confederation and it was first played in 2013.

Brazilian clubs in international competitions

Brazil national team
The following table lists all the games played by the Brazilian national team in official competitions and friendly matches during 2017.

Friendlies

2018 FIFA World Cup qualification

Superclásico de las Américas

Women's football

National team
The following table lists all the games played by the Brazil women's national football team in official competitions and friendly matches during 2017.

Friendlies

Tournament of Nations

Yongchuan International Tournament 

The Brazil women's national football team competed in the following competitions in 2017:

Campeonato Brasileiro de Futebol Feminino Série A1

The 2017 Campeonato Brasileiro de Futebol Feminino Série A1 started on March 12, 2017, and concluded on July 20, 2017.

Audax
Corinthians
Ferroviária
Flamengo/Marinha
Foz Cataratas
Grêmio
Iranduba
Kindermann
Ponte Preta
Rio Preto
Santos
São Francisco
São José
Sport
Vitória
Vitória das Tabocas

The Campeonato Brasileiro de Futebol Feminino Série A1 final was played between Santos and Corinthians.

Santos won the league after defeating Corinthians.

Relegation
The two worst placed teams, Grêmio and Vitória, were relegated to the following year's second level.

Campeonato Brasileiro de Futebol Feminino Série A2

The 2017 Campeonato Brasileiro de Futebol Feminino Série A2 started on May 10, 2017, and concluded on July 26, 2017.

Aliança
América Mineiro
Botafogo (PB)
Caucaia
Centro Olímpico
CRESSPOM
Duque de Caixas
JV Lideral
Mixto
Náutico
Pinheirense
Portuguesa (SP)
Tiradentes
Tuna Luso
UDA
Viana

The Campeonato Brasileiro de Futebol Feminino Série A2 final was played between Pinheirense and Portuguesa.

Pinheirense won the league after defeating Portuguesa (SP).

Promotion
The two best placed teams, which are Pinheirense and Portuguesa (SP), were promoted to the following year's first level.

Domestic competition champions

Brazilian clubs in international competitions

References

 Brazilian competitions at RSSSF

 
Seasons in Brazilian football